Hervé Marseille (born 20 August 1954) is a French politician and Senator.

References 

1954 births
Living people
Union of Democrats and Independents politicians
French Senators of the Fifth Republic
People from Abbeville
Politicians from Hauts-de-France
Mayors of places in Île-de-France
Chevaliers of the Légion d'honneur
Officers of the Ordre national du Mérite